Vernadskogo may refer to:

 Vernadsky (disambiguation)
 Prospekt Vernadskogo (disambiguation)